Darshan Academy is a CBSE Affiliated, English medium, co-educational private high school. The school is situated in 22 cities of India and Abroad- Ambala, Amritsar, Bhubaneswar, Bigas, Dasuya, Delhi, Devlali, Ferozepur, Guleria Bhat, Hisar, Jalandhar, Jansat, Kaithal, Kalka, Lucknow, Ludhiana, Meerut, Modasa, Pune, Rathonda, Sundargarh and Cali (Colombia).

Overview 
Darshan Academy was founded by Sant Rajinder Singh Ji Maharaj. The school teaches students from classes Pre-KG to 12th. Darshan Academy offers Senior Secondary Education in the fields of Science (Medical, Non-Medical), Commerce and Humanities.

School Motto 
"Creating Generations of Peacemakers".

Magazine 
The annual school magazine is Darshanika. It contains articles on various school events of the past year, literary works from students of all standards and achievements, as well as accolades received by students and school staff in the past year. The magazine consists of text, primarily in English, Spanish, Hindi, Sanskrit and other regional languages.

Subjects 
The following subjects are offered in Class 11th and are continued in 12th:
 Physics
 Chemistry
 Mathematics
 English
 Biology
 Informatics Practices
 Physical Education
 Accountancy
 Business Studies
 Economics
 History
 Political Science

Houses 
There are four houses:
  Sawan House
  Kirpal House
  Darshan House
 Rajinder House

Awards and honors 

 British Council International School Award: Darshan Academy, Ludhiana received the British Council International School Award 2018. This award has been won by other Darshan Academies in the past (2013-2016).
 Education Today School Excellence Merit Award: EducationToday.co Ranked "Darshan Academy, Delhi" as No.1 under category "Holistic Development" and ranked "Darshan Academy Meerut," as No.1 under category "Top Schools - City Wise".
 Brainfeed School Excellence Award: Brainfeed ranked Darshan Academy among the Top 500 Schools in India. It is awarded for the categories:

 CBSE School
 Excellence in Innovative Practices
 Happiness Quotient Index Schools
 Excellence in Life Skill Education

 Ingenious Instructor Ascendancy Award: Principal of Darshan Academy, Dasuya, Mr. Rasik Gupta was honored with the award of ‘Ingenious Instructor Ascendancy’ at Dinanagar by CBSE Regional Director, Mr. R.J Khanderao, for his excellence in the field of Education.

References

External links 
 www.darshanacademy.org

Private schools in India